is a Japanese professional baseball player. He was born on February 1, 1987. He debuted in 2006. He had 2 runs in 2013.

References

External links

Living people
1987 births
Baseball people from Ehime Prefecture
Honolulu Sharks players
Japanese expatriate baseball players in the United States
Nippon Professional Baseball outfielders
Hokkaido Nippon-Ham Fighters players
Tokyo Yakult Swallows players